Eucithara pulchra is a small sea snail, a marine gastropod mollusc in the family Mangeliidae.

Description

Distribution
This marine species occurs off Madagascar.

References

 Bozzetti, L., 2009. - Anacithara punctostriata e Eucithara pulchra (Gastropoda: Hypsogastropoda: Conidae: Clathurellinae) due nuove specie dal Madagascar meridionale. Malacologia Mostra Mondiale 63: 8-10

External links
 MNHN, Paris: Eucithara pulchra

pulchra
Gastropods described in 2009